Qasr-e Mian (also Romanized as Qaşr-e Mīān, Qasr-e-Mīyan, Qasr-i- Mīān, and Qāsr-e Meyān; Dīvānī and Quer-i-Mīān) is a village in Rayen Rural District, Rayen District, Kerman County, Kerman Province, Iran. At the 2006 census, its population was 73, in 17 families.

References 

Populated places in Kerman County